Prosimulium mixtum, the mixed-up black fly, is a species of black flies (insects in the family Simuliidae).

References

Further reading

External links

 

Simuliidae